Rossbodenstock is a mountain peak of the Saint-Gotthard Massif and part of the Lepontine Alps south of the Oberalp Pass.

The source of the Rein da Tuma, the source of the Rhine is on the eastern flank of the mountain.

Mountains of the Alps
Mountains of the canton of Uri
Mountains of Graubünden
Graubünden–Uri border
Rhine
Mountains of Switzerland
Andermatt
Tujetsch